Andreja Smrekar (born 30 July 1967) is a Slovenian cross-country skier. She competed in three events at the 1984 Winter Olympics, representing Yugoslavia.

Cross-country skiing results

Olympic Games

References

External links
 

1967 births
Living people
Slovenian female cross-country skiers
Olympic cross-country skiers of Yugoslavia
Cross-country skiers at the 1984 Winter Olympics
Skiers from Ljubljana